Freddy Söderberg (born 8 November 1984) is a Swedish football striker who is currently free agent.

After a hard start in "Bajen" he finally scored two goals in a homegame versus Ljungskile SK on the 3 August 2008. The game ended 2-2. Söderberg scored the 2-2 goal for Hammarby in the games last minute.

Söderbergs contract is ended after the 2010 season. In 2011, he signed with his former club Östers IF, and after his return to Öster he scored ten goals in his first season back.

References

External links
  (archive)
  (archive)
 Freddy Söderberg at Fotbolltransfers.com 
 
 Freddy Söderberg at Elitefootball.com

1984 births
Living people
Swedish footballers
IFK Värnamo players
Östers IF players
Hammarby Fotboll players
Allsvenskan players
Association football forwards